Karl Ludwig (14 May 1886 – 3 February 1948) was a German international footballer.

References

1886 births
1948 deaths
Association football midfielders
German footballers
Germany international footballers